The Jackson Laboratory (often abbreviated as JAX) is an independent, non-profit biomedical research institution which was founded by Clarence Cook Little . It employs more than 3,000 employees in Bar Harbor, Maine; Sacramento, California; Farmington, Connecticut; Shanghai, China; and Yokohama, Japan.  The institution is a National Cancer Institute-designated Cancer Center and has NIH Centers of Excellence in aging and systems genetics. The mission of The Jackson Laboratory is "to discover the genetic basis for preventing, treating and curing human diseases, and to enable research and education for the global biomedical community." 

The laboratory is also the world's source for more than 8,000 strains of genetically defined mice, home of the Mouse Genome Informatics database, and is an international hub for scientific courses, conferences, training and education.

Major research areas
Jackson Laboratory's research, represented by the activities of more than 60 laboratories, performs researches in six areas:
 Cancer: The Jackson Laboratory Cancer Center (JAXCC) has a National Cancer Institute designated Cancer Center. Cancer areas of focus include: brain, leukemia, lung, lymphoma, prostate, breast; cancer initiation and progression; cancer prevention and therapies
 Development/Reproductive biology: birth defects, Down syndrome, osteoporosis, fertility
 Immunology: HIV-AIDS, anemia, autoimmunity, cancer immunology, immune system disorders, lupus, tissue transplant rejection, vaccines
 Metabolic diseases: atherosclerosis, cardiovascular disease, diabetes, high blood pressure, obesity
 Neurobiology: blindness, Alzheimer's, deafness, epilepsy, glaucoma, macular degeneration, neurodegenerative diseases 
 Neurobehavioral disorders: autism, addiction, depression

History
The Jackson Laboratory was founded by Clarence Cook Little, a former University of Maine and University of Michigan president, in 1929 in Bar Harbor, Maine under the name Roscoe B. Jackson Memorial Laboratory with the purpose of discovering the causes of cancer and other diseases through research on mammals. The campus was built on 13 acres of land donated by George Dorr. Initial funding for the laboratory campus came from Edsel Ford, the son of Henry Ford, and from Roscoe B. Jackson, a one-time head of the Hudson Motor Car Company, for whom the institution is named. As well as providing funds for the first laboratory building, Roscoe B. Jackson provided support for the first five years of operation.

The sale of mouse animal models began in 1933 with early sales to the United States Public Health Service and The Jackson Laboratory now provides a high proportion of the mice used in biomedical research  In particular, the C57BL/6J strain, which is widely used and cited is maintained at The Jackson Laboratory. The demand for mice generated at The Jackson Lab increased in 1937, when the Surgeon General supported a National Cancer Institute grant to the lab that made mice produced there a de facto industry standard due to federal standardization requirements because it was the only large-scale mouse provider prior to World War II.

The research performed at The Jackson Laboratory is associated with at least 26 Nobel Prizes in Physiology or Medicine via research, resources, or educational programming. Some notable findings from the institution include:
 Established that cancer is a genetic disorder, a novel concept before the Laboratory's founding in 1929.
 Dr. Leroy Stevens first described cells that can develop into different tissues – today known as stem cells.
 Dr. Elizabeth Russell performed the first bone marrow transplants in a mammal, leading to new treatments for blood and immunological diseases.
 Dr. George Snell won the Nobel Prize in 1980 for providing an in-depth understanding of the immune system's major histocompatibility complex, making organ transplants possible.
 Dr. Douglas L. Coleman discovered the hormone leptin, central to obesity and diabetes research, earning him the Shaw Prize, the Albert Lasker Award, the Gairdner International Award, Frontiers of Knowledge Award in Biomedicine, and the King Faisal International Prize in Medicine.
 Use of cancer avatars – mice with implanted human tumors – to test targeted therapies for cancer patients.
 Recent research has provided insight into cancer stem cells and treatments for leukemia; progress with type 1 diabetes and lupus; and a breakthrough in extending mammalian life span.

Highlights

A grant from the National Institute of General Medical Sciences funds the development of new computational tools to understand how multiple genes interact in complex diseases.
The National Institute on Aging provides $25 million to develop new treatments, future therapies based on precision modeling.
The National Institutes of Health (NIH) funds phase 2 of the Knockout Mouse Production and Phenotyping Project (KOMP2).
Researchers link mutations to butterfly-shaped pigment dystrophy, an inherited macular disease 
Jackson Laboratory researchers discover mutation involved in neurodegeneration
The Jackson Laboratory for Genomic Medicine opens in Farmington, CT in October 2014
In October 2020 it received a $11.8M USD grant from Harold Alfond Foundation.

The Jackson Laboratory Cancer Center
The Jackson Laboratory Cancer Center (JAXCC) first received its National Cancer Institute designation in 1983 in recognition of the foundational cancer research conducted there. The JAXCC is one of seven NCI-designated Cancer Centers with a focus on basic research.

The Jackson Laboratory Cancer Center has a single program, "Genetic Models for Precision Cancer Medicine," composed of three biological themes: cancer cell robustness, genomic and genetic complexity, and progenitor cell biology. The themes emphasize the systems genetics of cancer and translational cancer genomics, and all are supported by the JAX Cancer Center's technological initiatives in mouse modeling, genome analytics and quantitative cell biology.

The Morrell Park fire
On May 10 1989 a flash fire destroyed the Morrell Park mouse production facility. The fire raged for five hours, requiring over 100 firefighters from 15 companies and a total of 16 trucks for the fire to be contained. Four workers of the Colwell Construction Company who were installing fiberglass wallboard in the room where the fire broke out were injured, one with burns over 15 percent of his body. While none of the foundation strains were lost, 300000 production mice (about 50% of their stock) died, resulting in a national shortage of laboratory mice and the layoff of 60 employees.

This was the second fire to severely affect the laboratory; the 1947 fire that burned most of the island destroyed most of the laboratory, and its mice. Worldwide donations of funds and mice allowed the lab to resume operations in 1948.

Acquisitions 
In October 2021, Jackson Lab bought Japan-based research animal business from Charles River Laboratories International for US$63 million.

Research resources
 Hosts the Mouse Genome Informatics database

Business model
The Jackson Laboratory is recognized by the IRS as a public charity.  According to organization literature, revenue comes primarily from the sale of materials and services (~70%) and from government support (~25%).  Less than 5% of 2012 revenue came from charitable donations.

Notable researchers
Edison Liu
Nadia Rosenthal
Charles Lee
Muriel Davisson
George Weinstock
Leroy Stevens
Elizabeth Russell
George Snell

Controversy

In 2013, a jury in Maine found that Jackson Laboratory did not violate that state's whistleblower protection law when they fired an employee who claimed to have been terminated after reporting her concerns about the treatment of animals to the National Institutes of Health Office for Laboratory Animal Welfare. The worker accused the laboratory of "allowing mice to suffer and then die in their cages instead of euthanizing them" and of cutting off the toes of mice to identify them. Jackson Laboratory denied the allegations and said the worker was fired for her confrontational demeanor.

In 2009, Jackson Laboratory was fined $161,680 by the EPA for improperly handling and storing hazardous materials.

See also
Highseas, a former Bar Harbor summer estate owned by the laboratory
Animal Testing

References

Mount Desert Island
Buildings and structures in Bar Harbor, Maine
Medical research institutes in the United States
Cancer organizations based in the United States
Companies based in Hancock County, Maine
Scientific organizations established in 1929
Medical and health organizations based in Maine
Research institutes in Maine
Research institutes in California
Research institutes in Connecticut